Rabbi Ira Eisenstein (November 26, 1906 – June 28, 2001) was an American rabbi who founded Reconstructionist Judaism, along with Rabbi Mordecai Kaplan, his teacher and, later, father-in-law through his marriage to Judith Kaplan, over a period of time spanning from the late 1920s to the 1940s. Reconstructionist Judaism formally became a distinct denomination within Judaism with the foundation of the Reconstructionist Rabbinical College in 1968, where he was the founding president.

Biography
A native of Manhattan, New York, Rabbi Eisenstein held a bachelor's degree and a doctoral degree from Columbia University. In 1931, he was ordained by the Jewish Theological Seminary, where he first met and married Judith Kaplan Eisenstein, daughter of founder Mordecai Kaplan.

After his ordination, Rabbi Eisenstein became associate rabbi and then rabbi of the Society for the Advancement of Judaism, the first Reconstructionist congregation, which Kaplan founded in 1922. He also served as religious leader of the Anshe Emet Synagogue in Chicago, as well as the Reconstructionist Synagogue of the North Shore on Long Island, N.Y.

A former president of the Conservative Rabbinical Assembly of America, Rabbi Eisenstein served as president of the Jewish Reconstructionist Foundation from 1959 to 1970. From 1935 to 1981, he was editor of The Reconstructionist, the movement's magazine.

Alongside Rabbi Jack Cohen, Rabbi Milton Steinberg, and Rabbi Eugene Kohn, he was one of Kaplan's main disciples.

Ira Eisenstein was the grandson of Julius (Judah D.) Eisenstein.

Works
 Creative Judaism (1941)
 The Ethics of Toleration Applied to Religious Groups in America (1941)
 Judaism Under Freedom (1956)
 What We Mean by Religion (1958)
 Varieties of Jewish Belief (1966)
 Reconstructing Judaism: An Autobiography (1986)

References

Notes

Sources
The Jewish Exponent, December 5, 2004
""Rabbi Ira Eisenstein, 94, Dies; Led Reconstructionist Jews", New York Times, Sunday, July 1, 2001

1906 births
2001 deaths
People from Manhattan
American Reconstructionist rabbis
American Conservative rabbis
Jews and Judaism in New York City
Rabbis from Chicago
Columbia University alumni
Jewish Theological Seminary of America semikhah recipients
American Jewish theologians
Jewish American writers
Religious naturalists
Rabbis from New York (state)
20th-century American rabbis